Karen Furneaux (born December 23, 1976) is a Canadian sprint kayaker who has been competing since 1988. A native of Halifax, Nova Scotia, she won nine medals at the ICF Canoe Sprint World Championships. This includes two golds (K-1 200 m: 2001, K-2 200 m: 1998), three silvers (K-1 500 m: 2005, K-2 500 m: 1999, K-4 200 m: 1997), and four bronzes (K-1 200 m: 2005, 2006; K-1 1000 m: 2005, K-1 4 x 200 m: 2009).

Furneaux also competed in three Summer Olympics, earning her best finish of fifth in the K-2 500 m event at Sydney in 2000.

In 2018 she was named one of the greatest 15 athletes in Nova Scotia's history.

References

 Canoe09.ca profile 
 
 
 Official website
 

1976 births
Canadian people of French descent
Canadian female canoeists
Canoeists at the 2000 Summer Olympics
Canoeists at the 2004 Summer Olympics
Canoeists at the 2008 Summer Olympics
Living people
Sportspeople from Halifax, Nova Scotia
Olympic canoeists of Canada
ICF Canoe Sprint World Championships medalists in kayak
Pan American Games medalists in canoeing
Pan American Games gold medalists for Canada
Canoeists at the 1999 Pan American Games
Medalists at the 1999 Pan American Games